Kai Restaurant is a Forbes Travel Guide 5-star restaurant in Chandler, Arizona. It specializes in native regional cuisine of central Arizona with locally sourced heirloom ingredients, sometimes from the Gila River Indian Reservation. The menu is influenced by local Maricopa and Pima culture.

References

Restaurants in Arizona
Buildings and structures in Phoenix, Arizona